Morris Oxford is a series of motor car models produced by Morris Motors of the United Kingdom, from the 1913 bullnose Oxford to the Farina Oxfords V and VI.  The manufacture of Morris's Oxford cars, named by W R Morris after the university town in which he grew up, would turn Oxford into an industrial city.

From 1913 to mid-1935 Oxford cars grew in size and quantity. In 1923 they with the Cowley cars were 28.1 per cent of British private car production. In 1925 Morris sold near double the number and they represented 41 per cent of British production. The model name was recycled in 1948 and lasted almost another 23 years through to 1971 but in this time the market sector and engine-size remained nearly constant between 1476 cc and 1622 cc.

Aside from the Oxford Sixes and the Oxford Empire models all Oxfords since 1918 have been 12 or 14 HP cars of about 1500 to 1800 cc.

Saloon

The Oxford was updated for 1957 with a new fluted bonnet and small rear fins and an optional two-tone paint scheme all announced on 18 October 1956.  Inside the bench seats trimmed in leather remained but the instrument cluster was revised and a new dished steering wheel fitted. The engine now produced 55 hp (41 kW) following an increase in compression ratio though the top speed and acceleration remained the same. A semi-automatic, two pedal, "Manumatic" transmission with centrifugal clutch with vacuum operation coupled to gear changes was optional.
Independent front-suspension with forward torsion bars continued to promise "above average comfort" for the car's occupants.

Traveller
The 'woody' Series III Traveller was replaced by the Series IV in 1957, though the saloon remained in production until 1959, when the Series V styled by Carrozzeria Pinin Farina (later Pininfarina) was introduced. 58,117 Series III and Series IV Oxfords were built.

The test car cost £898 including taxes of £300.

Ambassador
This car was the basis for the Hindustan Ambassador or 'Amby' which was built in India until 2014. The car featured a few styling updates but kept the original look, albeit with modern powertrains. Sales declined from a high of 24,000 units a year in the mid-1980s to under 12,000 a decade later and to less than 6,000 in the mid-2000s.  Hindustan Motors stopped production of the Ambassador cars in May 2014.

Oxford Traveller all-steel Series IV 1957–60

The Oxford IV was only made in the Traveller estate version.  A steel-bodied replacement for the "woody" Series III Traveller, it was similar to the Series III saloon in most respects.  The IV was introduced in 1957, announced by BMC with the Riley Two-Point-Six on 23 August 1957 and produced alongside the Series V until 1960.  An interesting feature was having fillers on both sides of the car, for the single fuel tank.

References
Footnotes

Bibliography

Issigonis vehicles
Oxford